Scoparia manifestella is a species of moth in the family Crambidae. It is found in France, Italy, Austria, Switzerland, Germany and on the Balkan Peninsula.

The wingspan is about 23 mm.

References

Moths described in 1848
Scorparia
Moths of Europe